CD Vera may refer to:

CD Vera (Tenerife), Spanish football club based in Puerto de la Cruz, Canary Islands
CD Vera de Almería, Spanish football club based in Vera, Andalusia